Petar Glintić (Serbian Cyrillic: Петар Глинтић; born 9 June 1992) is a Serbian football goalkeeper who last played for Javor Ivanjica.

References

External links
 
 Petar Glintić Stats at utakmica.rs
 

Association football goalkeepers
Serbian footballers
Serbian First League players
Serbian SuperLiga players
FK Javor Ivanjica players
FK Smederevo players
FK Sloga Petrovac na Mlavi players
FK Sloga Požega players
1992 births
Living people
People from Ivanjica
Serbian expatriate footballers
Serbian expatriate sportspeople in Slovakia
Expatriate footballers in Slovakia
MŠK Rimavská Sobota players
2. Liga (Slovakia) players